Langley is a hamlet and civil parish in the non-metropolitan district of North Hertfordshire and county of Hertfordshire. The population was 175 in the 2011 census. It is located four miles south of Hitchin, on the B656 road near the large town of Stevenage. Minsden Chapel lies within the parish.

Prior to 1894, Langley and neighbouring Preston were part of the parish of Hitchin, together forming a long salient to the south of the town itself. Langley and Preston became separate civil parishes as a result of the Local Government Act 1894, with effect from the first parish meeting on 4 December 1894. Langley civil parish was then included in the Hitchin Rural District between 1894 and 1974, when it became part of North Hertfordshire.

Governance

North Hertfordshire District Council

Langley is located within the local government district of North Hertfordshire and within the Ward of Hitchwood, Offa and Hoo.

Hitchwood, Offa and Hoo Ward is a Multi Member Ward represented by three Councillors (Cllr David Barnard (Conservative), Cllr Claire Strong (Conservative) and Cllr Faye Frost (Conservative).

Hertfordshire County Council
Langley is located within the Hertfordshire County Council Division of Knebworth and Codicote and is represented by Cllr Richard Thake (Conservative).

Parliamentary Representation

The Parish is represented in Parliament by Bim Afolami MP (Conservative) who was first elected as the MP for Hitchin and Harpenden in 2017.

References

Villages in Hertfordshire
Civil parishes in Hertfordshire